On April 8, 1813, Representative Robert Whitehill (DR) of Pennsylvania's  died in office.  A special election was held on May 11, 1813 to fill the vacancy left by his death.

Election results

Rea took his seat on May 28, 1813.

See also
List of special elections to the United States House of Representatives

References

Pennsylvania 1813 05
Pennsylvania 1813 05
1813 05
Pennsylvania 05
United States House of Representatives 05
United States House of Representatives 1813 05
April 1813 events